Culle, also spelled Culli, Cullí, or Kulyi, is a poorly attested extinct language of the Andean highlands of northern Peru. It is the original language of the highlands of La Libertad Region, the south of the Cajamarca Region (Cajabamba), and the north of the Ancash region (Pallasca and Bolognesi). It is known through various word lists collected while the language was still spoken and through vocabulary loaned into the Spanish spoken in the region.

Flores Reyna (1996) reports that Culli was spoken by at least one family in the town of Tauca, Pallasca Province, Ancash region, until the middle of the 20th century. While it appears that Culli has been displaced in its whole range by Spanish, the possibility of speakers remaining in some remote village cannot be ruled out altogether.

Culli was the language spoken in the territory of at least three Pre-Inca cultures or dominions: The kingdom of Konchuko (Conchucos), in the north of the Ancash region; the kingdom of Wamachuko (Huamachuco), in the highlands of La Libertad region; and Culli was spoken at least in the southern part of the kingdom of Kuismanko (Cuismanco), in the south of the Cajamarca region.

Classification
Because it is poorly attested, it has not been possible to definitively classify Culle.

Jolkesky (2016) also notes that there are lexical similarities with Leco.

Vocabulary
What little is known of the Culle language consists mostly of vocabulary. A sample list of words is given by Loutkotka (1968); some of these are presented here:

ahhi – woman
pič – bird
čallua – fish
ču – head
čukuáll – heart
mai – foot
koñ, goñ – water
kumú – drink
mú – fire
sú – sun
múñ – moon
urú – tree
usú – man

A more extensive word list from Loukotka (1949) is given below:

Notes
(Sp.) = Spanish loanword (excluded)

Sources used by Loukotka (1949)
Manuscript by Martínez Compañón from the 1700s
Words collected by Paul Rivet in 1934 from Gonzales, a Kulli medicine man in Pallasca, Department of Ancash, Peru

{| class="wikitable sortable"
! French gloss (original) !! English gloss (translated) !! Kulli (Martínez Compañón) !! Kulli (Gonzales) !! comparisons
|-
| animal || animal || (Sp.) ||  || 
|-
| arbre || tree || urú ||  || 
|-
| boire || drink || kumú ||  || Kolan: kum
|-
| chandelle || candle ||  || nina || Kechua: nina
|-
| bois || wood ||  || guro || 
|-
| bois à brûler || firewood ||  || pišoče || 
|-
| chapeau || hat ||  || muntua || 
|-
| chien || dog ||  || korep || 
|-
| ciel || sky || (Sp.) ||  || 
|-
| cœur || heart || čukuáll ||  || 
|-
| corps || body || (Sp.) ||  || 
|-
| cou || neck ||  || uro || 
|-
| couverture || blanket ||  || maiko || 
|-
| douleur || pain || pillač ||  || 
|-
| eau || water || koñ || goñ || 
|-
| étoiles || stars || čuip ||  || Sechura: chúpchúp
|-
| femme || woman || ahhi ||  || 
|-
| feu || fire || mú ||  || 
|-
| fille || daughter || ahhi ogóll ||  || (see femme)
|-
| fils || son || usu ogóll ||  || (see homme)
|-
| fleur || flower || čučú ||  || Hibito: chukchum
|-
| fleuve || river || uram ||  || 
|-
| frère || brother || kimit ||  || 
|-
| fruit || fruit || huakohu ||  || 
|-
| gai || happy || kuhi ||  || 
|-
| herbe || grass || paihak ||  || chimú: pey
|-
| homme || man || usú ||  || Katakao: aszat
|-
| lune || moon || múñ ||  || 
|-
| main || hand ||  || pui || 
|-
| manger || eat || miú ||  || 
|-
| mangeur de pain || bread eater ||  || huiku-vana || 
|-
| mer || sea || kida ||  || 
|-
| mère || mother || mamá ||  || Kechua: mama
|-
| mort || dead || koní ||  || 
|-
| ohé! || hey! ||  || čo || 
|-
| oiseau || bird || pičuñ || pičon || Kechua: pisku
|-
| ondes || waves || kóñpulkasú ||  || see eau
|-
| os || bone || moskár ||  || 
|-
| pain || bread ||  || vana || 
|-
| père || father || kinú ||  || 
|-
| pied || foot ||  || mai || 
|-
| pleurer || cry || akasú ||  || Hibito: atzakem
|-
| pluie || rain || kau ||  || 
|-
| poisson || fish || čallua ||  || Kechua: challua
|-
| poule || chicken ||  || guallpe || Kechua: atahuallpa
|-
| rameau || branch || urú sagars ||  || 
|-
| régner || reign || kankiá ||  || 
|-
| sandales || sandals ||  || maivil || see pied
|-
| sœur || sister || kañi ||  || 
|-
| soleil || sun || sú ||  || 
|-
| terre || earth || pús ||  || 
|-
| tête || head ||  || ču || 
|-
| tronc || trunk || mukh-kusgá ||  || 
|-
| vent || wind || lluká ||  || 
|-
| ventre || belly ||  || odre || 
|-
| viande || meat || ayča ||  || 
|}

References

Indigenous languages of the Andes
Languages of Peru
Extinct languages of South America
Languages extinct in the 20th century
Language isolates of South America